Július Nôta (3 April 1971 – 20 February 2009) was a Slovak professional footballer. Nota played as a goalkeeper in both Slovakia and Hungary for clubs including Rimavská Sobota, Diósgyőri VTK and Budapest Honvéd. While at Diósgyőri VTK, Nota was involved in match-fixing allegations. Nota died on 20 February 2009 at the age of 37, after being stabbed to death.

References

External links

1971 births
2009 deaths
2009 murders in Europe
Slovak footballers
Male murder victims
People murdered in Slovakia
Slovak murder victims
Deaths by stabbing
Sportspeople from Rimavská Sobota
Association football goalkeepers
2009 crimes in Slovakia
2000s murders in Slovakia